Yates may refer to:

Places

United States
Fort Yates, North Dakota
Yates Spring, a spring in Georgia, United States
Yates City, Illinois
Yates Township, Illinois
Yates Center, Kansas
Yates, Michigan
Yates Township, Michigan 
Yates, Missouri
Yates, Montana
Yates, New York
Yates County, New York
Yates, West Virginia

Other uses
Yates (surname)
Yates (company), a New Zealand and Australian gardening company
Yates Racing, a NASCAR team
Yates's, a pub chain in the United Kingdom

See also
Yate (disambiguation)
Yates and Thom, engineering company from Blackburn, Lancashire
Yates v. United States, United States First-Amendment case
Yeates
Yeats (disambiguation)